Trichura druryi is a moth in the subfamily Arctiinae. It was described by Jacob Hübner in 1826. It is found in Mexico, Guatemala, Panama and Honduras.

References

Moths described in 1826
Arctiini